Sanford Ned Diller (June 4, 1928 – February 2, 2018) was an American billionaire and the founder of Prometheus Real Estate Group.

Biography
The only son of Claire (née Diller) and Jack Diller, Jewish immigrants from Vienna (originally from Eastern Galicia) who had settled in San Francisco, California. His parents owned a kosher style restaurant named "Diller's" in the Fillmore District in San Francisco during the Great Depression.

Diller graduated from the University of California, Berkeley and then graduated with a J.D. from the Hastings College of the Law.

After law school, Diller began acquiring and developing real estate in the mid-1960s. In 1965, he founded the Prometheus Real Estate Group. Prometheus grew to become the San Francisco Bay Area's largest private real-estate holding company of apartments with over 11,000 owned units and is valued at $2.3 billion. Prometheus was owned by Diller and his wife through a revocable trust.

Sanford passed away from natural causes on February 2, 2018 in his house in Woodside, California. He is buried in Mount of Olives, Jerusalem, Israel.

Philanthropy
In 2002, the Helen Diller Family Foundation donated $5 million to establish an endowment for a visiting Israeli scholar at Berkeley's Center for Middle Eastern Studies. Following two additional donations, one in 2019 and another in 2021, Berkeley honored Helen Diller by naming its Institute for Jewish Law and Israel Studies after her. In 2003, the Dillers donated $35 million to fund The Helen Diller Family Comprehensive Care Center at the UCSF complex on the biomedical campus of Mission Bay.  In 2018, the foundation announced a $500 million commitment to begin planning a new UCSF hospital; gifts to the university total more than $1.15 billion.

Since 1999, the Dillers have donated over $1 billion via their family foundation named after his wife Helen. Other major gifts have funded the renovation of the Julius Kahn playground at the Presidio; Mission Dolores Park Playground, now named Helen Diller Playground; and the preschool in the San Francisco Jewish Community Center, named Helen Diller Preschool. They also have supported San Francisco's de Young Museum, Museum of Modern Art and Legion of Honor Museum.

The Foundation operates two Jewish teen programs: an international Jewish teen leadership program, the Diller Teen Fellows and the Diller Teen Tikkun Olam Awards. Since 2007, the Diller Teen Tikkun Olam Awards have recognized Californian Jewish teens who are outstanding role models in their communities.

Personal life
In 1951, Diller married Helen Samuels (born 1928), the daughter of Jewish immigrants from Poland and a fellow Berkeley graduate whom he had met in college. Her father was a clothing salesman and shop owner. They have three children: Brad Diller, Ron Diller, and Jackie Safier, president of Prometheus. Diller lived in Woodside, California.

Sanford Diller is also the second cousin of the well known media executive, Barry Diller.

References

1927 births
2018 deaths
Jewish American philanthropists
American real estate businesspeople
University of California, Hastings College of the Law alumni
American billionaires
University of California, Berkeley
People from Woodside, California
Businesspeople from California
American people of Austrian-Jewish descent
20th-century American businesspeople
20th-century American philanthropists
21st-century American Jews